The patriarch of Antioch is one of the Eastern Orthodox patriarchs, the leader of the autocephalous Greek Orthodox Church of Antioch. The term "Greek" does not refer to ethnic origin; the majority of these patriarchs were not ethnic Greeks. It refers to the fact that this church follows the Chalcedonian Orthodoxy associated with the (Greek-speaking) Byzantine Empire. Since 518, there have been two Orthodox patriarchs of Antioch: the Chalcedonian ones listed here, and the non-Chalcedonian Syriac Orthodox patriarchs of Antioch.

Greek Orthodox patriarchs of Antioch from 518 to 1724

Paul the Jew (518–521)
Euphrasius (521–526)
Ephraim of Amid (526–546)
Domnus III (546–561)
Anastasius I of Antioch (561–571)
Gregory (571–594)
Anastasius I of Antioch (restored) (594–599)
Anastasius II (599–610)
Gregory II (610–620)
Anastasius III (620–628)
Macedonius (639–662)
George I (662–669)
Macarius (669–681)
Theophanes (681–684)
Sebastian (687–690)
George II (691–702)
Stephen IV (743–744)
Theophylact (744–750)
Theodore I (750-773)
Theodoret (781–812)
Job (813–844)
Nicholas (846–868)
Theodosius I (870–890)
Simeon (892–907)
Elias (907–934)
Theodosius II (936-943)
Theocharistus (944-948)
Agapius I (953-959)
Christopher (960–967)
Eustratius (969)
Theodore II (970–976)
Agapius II (978–996)
John III (996–1021)
Nicholas II (1025–1030)
Elias II (1032–1033)
Theodore III (1034-1042) 
Basil II (?-?)
Peter III (1052–1056)
John IV (1056–1057)
Theodosius III (1057–1059)
Aemilian (1074–1078)
Nicephorus (1079–?)
John V (or IV) (1091–1100)

After 1098, the patriarchate was in exile, at first at Constantinople, having been replaced by a Latin patriarch.

John VI (or V) (1106–1134)
Soterichos Panteugenos (elect, 1156–1157)
Euthymius (1159–1164)
Macarius II (1164–1166)
Athanasius I (1166–1180)
Theodosius III (1180–1182)
Elias III (1182–1184)
Christopher II (1184–1185)
Theodore IV (Balsamon) (1185–1199)
Joachim (1199–1219)
Dorotheus (1219–1245)
Simeon II (1245–1268)
Euthymius (1268–1269)
Theodosius IV (1269–1276)

With Theodosius, the patriarchate returned to Antioch.

Theodosius V Villehardouin (1276–1285)
Arsenius (1285–1293)
Dionysius (1293–1308)
Mark (1308–1342)
Ignatius II (1342–1386)

With Ignatius, the patriarchate transferred to Damascus.

Pachomius (1386–1393)
Nilus (1393–1401)
Michael III (1401–1410)
Pachomius II (1410–1411)
Joachim II (1411–1426)
Mark III (1426–1436)
Dorotheus II (1436–1454)
Michael IV (1454–1476)
Mark IV (1476)
Joachim III (1476–1483)
Gregory III (1483–1497)
Dorotheus III (1497–1523)
Michael V (1523–1541)
Dorotheus IV (1541–1543)
Joachim IV (Ibn Juma) (1543–1576)
Michael VI (Sabbagh) (1577–1581)
Joachim V (1581–1592)
Joachim VI (1593–1604)
Dorotheus IV (or V) Ibn Al-Ahmar (1604–1611)
Athanasius II (or III) Dabbas (1611–1619)
Ignatius III Atiyah (1619–1634)
Cyril IV Dabbas (1619–1628)
Euthymius II (or III) Karmah (1634–1635)
Euthymius III (or IV) of Chios (1635–1647)
Macarius III Ibn al-Za'im (1647–1672)
Neophytos of Chios (1673–1682)
Athanasius III Dabbas (first, reign) (1685–1694)
Cyril V (or III) Zaim ((Communion with Rome) 1672–1694, 1694–1720)
Athanasius III Dabbas (second reign) (1720–1724)

The Greek Orthodox Patriarchate of Antioch split into two factions in 1724 as the Melkite Greek Catholic Church broke communion with the Orthodox Church and established communion with the Catholic Church. Both groups recognize the same list of patriarchs for the period before 1724, but have had different patriarchs since.

Greek Orthodox patriarchs of Antioch after 1724
Sylvester (1724–1766) (appointed by Ecumenical Patriarchate of Constantinople)
Philemon (1766–1767)
Daniel (1767–1791)
Euthymius V (1791–1813)
Seraphim (1813–1823)
Methodius (1823–1850)
Hierotheos (1850–1885)
Gerasimos (1885–1891)
Spyridon (1891–1898)
Meletius II (Doumani) (1899–1906)
Gregory IV (Haddad) (1906–1928)
vacant (1928–1931)
Alexander III (Tahhan) (1931–1958)
Arsenius II (Haddad) (1931–1933) (schism)
Theodosius VI (Abou Rjaileh) (1958–1970)
Elias IV (Mouawwad) (1970–1979)
Ignatius IV (Hazim) (1979–2012)
John X (Yazigi) (2012–)

Literature 
 
 
 
 
 Prosopographie der mittelbyzantinischen Zeit

References 

Antioch
Antioch
Syria religion-related lists
Greek Orthodox Patriarchs